Scary Stories is the debut collection of five short stories by Don Roff. In addition to the stories, the 64-page book contains blank pages for readers to write their own horror tales. The hardback book has a creepy hand lock and key to keep any writing in the book by the owner confidential.  The book was published by Tangerine Press, an imprint of Scholastic Corporation through Scholastic Book Clubs.

Table of contents

 That Old House
 The Girl Who Came Out of the Fog
 The Thing Under the Waves
 Clowning Around
 It Came from the Woods

2006 short story collections
Horror short story collections
Scholastic Corporation books